Conalia baudii is a beetle in the genus Conalia of the family Mordellidae. It was described in 1858 by Mulsant & Rey.

References

Mordellidae
Beetles described in 1858